Hamid (also Romanized as Ḩamīd; also known as Qal‘eh Ḩamīd) is a village in Baba Aman Rural District, in the Central District of Bojnord County, North Khorasan Province, Iran. At the 2006 census, its population was 651, in 135 families.

References 

Populated places in Bojnord County